James Conrad Airport,  is an airstrip serving Ranguelmo (es), a forest products town in the Bío Bío Region of Chile.

The runway sits on a low ridge just west of the town. There is hilly terrain in all quadrants.

See also

Transport in Chile
List of airports in Chile

References

External links
OpenStreetMap - James Conrad
OurAirports - James Conrad
FallingRain - James Conrad Airport

Airports in Ñuble Region